Zinc finger protein GLI3 is a protein that in humans is encoded by the GLI3 gene.

This gene encodes a protein that belongs to the C2H2-type zinc finger proteins subclass of the Gli family. They are characterized as DNA-binding transcription factors and are mediators of Sonic hedgehog (Shh) signaling. The protein encoded by this gene localizes in the cytoplasm and activates patched Drosophila homolog (PTCH1) gene expression. It is also thought to play a role during embryogenesis.

Role in development 
Gli3 is a known transcriptional repressor but may also have a positive transcriptional function.  Gli3 represses dHand and Gremlin, which are involved in developing digits.  There is evidence that Shh-controlled processing (e.g., cleavage) regulates transcriptional activity of Gli3 similarly to that of Ci.  Gli3 mutant mice have many abnormalities including CNS and lung defects and limb polydactyly.  In the developing mouse limb bud, Gli3 derepression predominantly regulates Shh target genes.

Disease association
Mutations in this gene have been associated with several diseases, including Greig cephalopolysyndactyly syndrome, Pallister–Hall syndrome, preaxial polydactyly type IV, and postaxial polydactyly types A1 and B. DNA copy-number alterations that contribute to increased conversion of the oncogenes Gli1–3 into transcriptional activators by the Hedgehog signaling pathway are included in a genome-wide pattern, which was found to be correlated with an astrocytoma patient's outcome.

There is evidence that the autosomal dominant disorder Greig cephalopolysyndactyly syndrome (GCPS) that affects limb and craniofacial development in humans is caused by a translocations within the GLI3 gene.

Interactions with Gli1 and Gli2
The independent overexpression Gli1 and Gli2 in mice models to lead to formation of basal cell carcinoma (BCC).  Gli1 knockout is shown to lead to similar embryonic malformations as Gli1 overexpressions but not the formation of BCCs.  Overexpression of Gli3 in transgenic mice and frogs does not lead to the development of BCC-like tumors and is not thought to play a role in tumor BCC formation.

Gli1 and Gli2 overexpression leads to BCC formation in mouse models and a one step model for tumour formation has been suggested in both cases.  This also indicates that Gli1 and/or Gli2 overexpression is vital in BCC formation.  Co-overexpression of Gli1 with Gli2 and Gli2 with Gli3 leads to transgenic mice malformations and death, respectively, but not the formation of BCC.  This suggests that overexpression of more than one Gli protein is not necessary for BCC formation.

Interactions 

GLI3 has been shown to interact with CREBBP SUFU, ZIC1, and ZIC2.

References

External links 
  GeneReviews/NCBI/NIH/UW entry on Pallister-Hall Syndrome
  GeneReviews/NCBI/NIH/UW entry on Greig Cephalopolysyndactyly Syndrome
 

Transcription factors